Grumet is a surname. Notable people with the surname include:

Jacob B. Grumet (1900–1987), American lawyer and judge
Madeleine Grumet (born 1940), American academic in curriculum theory and feminist theory

See also
Grummett